Rikberg is a surname. Notable people with the surname include:

 Alar Rikberg (born 1981), Estonian indiaca player
 Nils Rikberg (1928–2002), Finnish football player
 Rait Rikberg (born 1982), Estonian volleyball player

See also
 Risberg